Libra Records was a record label that well known Singaporean acts released their recordings on. One of its most well-known acts was the Western Union Band. The group had two no. 1 records on the label. Other acts to have their recordings released on the label were Kelsom, Glass Onion and The Sandboys.

Background
The Sandboys were the first group to have a single released on the label with "Candle Light" bw "Turn Around".
The band contained Hillary Francis was the lead singer and drummer.
In late 1971, Billboard listed Garrison, Kelsom, No Sweat, Tenderness and Western Union Band as belonging to the label.
The Western Union Band had "Something About You Baby" bw "Driving Me Crazy" released on Libra LRSP 009. By 18 March 1972, the song was at no.4 in the Malaysian Top 10. Before the year was out, the Western Union Band would have 2 no.1 hits. For the week ending 24 June, "Ive Found My Freedom" was at no.8 in Singapore, but it had hit the no.1 spot in Malaysia. And "Sausolito" was at no.1 in the Malaysian Top 10 by 26 August 1972. Family Robinson recorded the song "On the Ride (You Do It Once, You Do It Twice)" written by Lynsey de Paul and Ed Adamberry and it reached no.1 on the Malaysian singles chart on 9 February 1973.

The Glass Onion were a Singapore psych band who won the Bee Gees contest in Singapore. Their release on the label was "Purple Lady" backed with "It's Over".

Catalogue

References

Singaporean record labels